Artificial gills are unproven conceptualised devices to allow a human to be able to take in oxygen from surrounding water. This is speculative technology that has not been demonstrated in a documented fashion.  Natural gills work because nearly all animals with gills are thermoconformers (cold-blooded), so they need much less oxygen than a thermoregulator (warm-blood) of the same size. As a practical matter, it is unclear that a usable artificial gill could be created because of the large amount of oxygen a human would need extracted from the water.

Methods
Several potential methods exist for the development of artificial gills. One proposed method is the use of liquid breathing with a membrane oxygenator to solve the problem of carbon dioxide retention, the major limiting factor in liquid breathing. It is thought that a system such as this would allow for diving without risk of decompression sickness.

They are generally thought to be unwieldy and bulky, because of the massive amount of water that would have to be processed to extract enough oxygen to supply an active diver, as an alternative to a scuba set.

An average diver with a fully closed-circuit rebreather needs 1.5 liters of oxygen per minute while swimming or 0.64 liter per minute while resting. At least  of sea water per minute would have to be passed through the system, and this system would not work in anoxic water. Seawater in tropical regions with abundant plant life contains  of oxygen per liter of water. These calculations are based on the dissolved oxygen content of water.

See also

 Extracorporeal membrane oxygenation

References

External links
 History of attempts to develop artificial gills and the principles and problems involved.

 
 'Like A Fish' Underwater Breathing System: Artificial Gills for U.S. Navy SEALs?
 Specific publication reference dates from an unusual source
 Artificial gills in fiction (called a "hydrolung") in Tom Swift and the Electronic Hydrolung, by Victor Appleton. It is a rebreather, fitted with a device that extracts oxygen from surrounding water.

Diving medicine
Underwater breathing apparatus
Membrane technology